Ehmann is a German surname. Notable people with the name include:

Anton Ehmann (born 1972), Austrian football player
Frank Ehmann, American basketball player
Gottfried Ehmann, World War I flying ace
Karl Ehmann (1882–1967), Austrian stage and film actor
Wilhelm Ehmann (1904–1989), German church musicologist, musician, director and founder of a church music school

See also
Ehlmann
Ehman

German-language surnames